Aleut or variation may refer to;

 Aleuts, a peoples found in the Bering Sea/Straits area
 Aleut language, the language spoken by these peoples
 Alutiiq, a people found on the Aleut-Alaska Peninsula and Kodiah Island Archipelago, sometimes called "Aleut"
 Alutiiq language, the language spoken by these people, sometimes called "Aleut"
 Eskimo-Aleut language, the macrolanguage parent to Arctic languages of North America and eastern Asia
 Alaska Peninsula, also called the Aleut Peninsula, the peninsula leading from the Alaska state mainlain to the Aleutian Islands
 Aleutian Islands or Aleuts, Aleut Islands; an archipelago linking the Aleut-Alaska Peninsula of North America to the Kamchatka Peninsula of Asia
 Aleutsky District or Aleut District, Kamchatka Krai, Russian Far East, Russia
 The Aleut Corporation (founded 1972), an Alaska Native Regional Corporation for the Aleut people

See also

 
 
 Aleutian (disambiguation)